The Tarago River is a perennial river of the Western Port catchment, located in the West Gippsland region of the Australian state of Victoria.

Location and features
The Tarago River rises near Gentle Annie Camp, part of the south-eastern portion of the Yarra Ranges within the Bunyip State Park, near Bunyip Gap. The river flows generally east then south, then west by south, then west, then south, joined by two minor tributaries and the Bunyip River, before being channeled to form the Main Drain.

The South Gippsland Highway traverses the Main Drain near its river mouth, emptying into the Western Port.

See also

References 

Melbourne Water catchment
Rivers of Gippsland (region)
Western Port